František Bartoš may refer to:

František Bartoš (folklorist) (1837–1906), Moravian folksong collector and dialectologist
František Bartoš (motorcyclist) (1926–1987), Czech Grand Prix motorcycle road racer